Draco boschmai is a species of lizard in the family Agamidae. The species is endemic to Indonesia.

Etymology
The specific name, boschmai, is in honor of Dutch zoologist Hilbrand Boschma.

Geographic range
Within Indonesia D. boschmai is found on the islands of Adonara, Flores, Komodo, Lombok, Rinca, Sulawesi, Sumba, and Sumbawa.

Description
The patagium is dark brown.

Reproduction
D. boschmai is oviparous.

References

Further reading
Hennig W (1936). "Revision der Gattung Draco (Agamidae)". Temminckia, Leiden  1: 153–220. (Draco volans boschmai, new subspecies). (in German).
McGuire JA, Kiew BH (2001). "Phylogenetic systematics of Southeast Asian flying lizards (Iguania: Agamidae: Draco) as inferred from mitochondrial DNA sequence data". Biological Journal of the Linnean Society 72: 203–229. (Draco boschmai, new status).
Musters CJM (1983). "Taxonomy of the genus Draco L. (Agamidae, Lacertilia, Reptilia)". Zoologische Verhandelingen (199): 1–120. (Draco volans boschmai).

Draco (genus)
Reptiles of Indonesia
Reptiles described in 1936
Taxa named by Willi Hennig